was a Japanese naval aviator who served as a test pilot in the 1930s, and served as the commander of the 341st Tateyama Kōkūtai (Air Group) for kamikaze attacks in June 1944.

Career

In June 1934, Lt. Okamura was flight testing the second prototype of two Mitsubishi 1MF10 Experimental 7-Shi carrier fighters when it entered an irrecoverable flat spin. Okamura bailed out, but lost four fingers in the accident, jeopardizing his career as a fighter pilot.

During the Kuangda campaign in China in 1938, Okamura served as a flight leader in the 12th Air Group's fighter squadron, where he was renowned for developing new air tactics for the Navy and was noted as an expert aviator and trainer. He had formed an air demonstration team known as "Genda's Flying Circus" with Yoshita Kobayashi and Minoru Genda, using Nakajima A2N Type 90 fighters, at Yokosuka in 1932.

Captain Okamura was in charge of the Tateyama Base in Tokyo, as well as the 341st Air Group Home, and according to some sources, was the first officer to officially propose kamikaze attack tactics, by arranging with his superiors for the first investigations on the plausibility and mechanisms of intentional suicide attacks on 15 June 1944. He was a veteran fighter pilot, who instructed the Yokosuka Air Corps at the war's outbreak. He also commanded a fighter group under Vice Admiral Kimpei Teraoka.

Okamura had expressed his desire to lead a volunteer group of suicide attacks some four months before Admiral Takijiro Ohnishi, commander of the Japanese naval air forces in the Philippines, presented the idea to his staff. While Vice Admiral Shigeru Fukudome, commander of the second air fleet, was inspecting the 341st Air Group, Captain Okamura took the chance to express his ideas on crash-dive tactics. “In our present situation, I firmly believe that the only way to swing the war in our favor is to resort to crash-dive attacks with our planes. There is no other way. There will be more than enough volunteers for this chance to save our country, and I would like to command such an operation. Provide me with 300 planes and I will turn the tide of war.”

"In August of 1944 the Naval Air Research and Development Center instituted an emergency development program of special piloted glide bombs, which bore the first character of Oka [sic], and which henceforth came to be known as the Marudai project. From late October to November [the Japanese] held accelerated flight tests of the new glide bombs. Tokyo established a new air corps charged with the mission of operating the Marudai weapons, and by the close of November, pilot training was well on its way. Captain Motoharu Okamura, one of Japan's most famous senior fighter pilots, became the corps commander; Okamura selected as his first fliers experienced fighter and dive-bomber pilots. Actually, these pilots were selected prior to the first Kamakaze attacks in the Philippines. The selection was unnecessary, beyond the critical choices made by Okamura; volunteers poured in by the thousands for the new operation, despite the 'special nature' of their future missions."

As commander of the new kamikaze unit in 1944, Captain Okamura commented that "there were so many volunteers for suicide missions that he referred to them as a swarm of bees," explaining: "Bees die after they have stung."

After the war, Okamura shot himself in the face as penance for sending so many young men to their deaths.

Personal life
Okamura remarried after his first wife died.  He had several children. His brother-in-law was fellow IJN officer and aviator Takashige Egusa, who was noted for being the Air Group Commander of aircraft carrier Soryu during the Pearl Harbor attack through the ship's loss at the Battle of Midway.

Promotions
Midshipman - 1 June 1922
Ensign - 20 September 1923
Lieutenant (j.g.) - 1 December 1925
Lieutenant - 1 December 1927
Lieutenant Commander - 15 November 1934
Commander - 15 November 1939
Captain - 1 May 1944

References

Japanese military personnel of World War II
Japanese naval aviators
1901 births
1948 suicides
Suicides by firearm in Japan